Access card may refer to:

Smart card, used for access control
 Common Access Card
Access Card (Australia)
Access (credit card)